Madias Dodo Nzesso Ngake (born 20 April 1992 in Douala, Cameroon) is a Cameroonian weightlifter. She competed at the 2012 Summer Olympics in the -75 kg event and won a bronze medal.

References 

1992 births
Living people
Sportspeople from Douala
Olympic weightlifters of Cameroon
Weightlifters at the 2012 Summer Olympics
Cameroonian female weightlifters
Olympic bronze medalists for Cameroon
Olympic medalists in weightlifting
21st-century Cameroonian women